Cryptolectica is a genus of moths in the family Gracillariidae.

Species
Cryptolectica capnodecta Vári, 1961
Cryptolectica chrysalis Kumata & Ermolaev, 1988 
Cryptolectica ensiformis (Yuan, 1986) 
Cryptolectica euryphanta (Meyrick, 1911) 
Cryptolectica lazaroi Landry, 2006 
Cryptolectica monodecta (Meyrick, 1912) 
Cryptolectica pasaniae Kumata & Kuroko, 1988

External links
Global Taxonomic Database of Gracillariidae (Lepidoptera)

Acrocercopinae
Gracillarioidea genera